Ruth B. Mariano-Hernandez (born Ruth B. Mariano) is a Filipina politician and Member of the Philippine House of Representatives of Laguna's 2nd District since 2019. She previously served as board member of Laguna from 2016 to 2019 and councilor of Calamba from 1995 to 2004 and from 2007 to 2016. She is the wife of incumbent Laguna Governor Ramil Hernandez, with whom she has 2 daughters.

Political career 
In 1995, she ran as Member of the Calamba Municipal Council and re-elected in 1998 and in 2001. In 2007, she ran again for the said position and re-elected again in 2010 and in 2013. In 2016, she ran for Member of the Laguna Provincial Board from the 2nd district. In 2019, she ran as Member of the Philippine House of Representatives from Laguna's 2nd District and re-elected as congresswoman in 2022.

Personal life 
Mariano-Hernandez married Ramil Hernandez, whom she met as a fellow councilor of Calamba, and have two children namely, Natasha Camille and Natalie Truth.

She finished her undergraduate degree in the University of the Philippines Los Baños.

References 

1974 births
Living people
Women members of the House of Representatives of the Philippines
Members of the House of Representatives of the Philippines from Laguna (province)
University of the Philippines Los Baños alumni
21st-century Filipino women politicians
Members of the Laguna Provincial Board
Filipino city and municipal councilors